Cinebar is an unincorporated community in Lewis County, Washington, United States. It is located between State Route 508 and U.S. Route 12. Named for the cinnabar present in the mountains to the northeast, Cinebar is a rural area with a post office and fire station on State Route 508. Other communities near Cinebar include Silver Creek, Salkum, Morton, Onalaska, Napavine, Chehalis, and Centralia.

Parks and recreation

Nearby attractions and points of interest include the Cowlitz River, the Tilton River, Lake Mayfield, Lake Mayfield Park, Mayfield Resort, and Ike Kinswa State Park.

Government and politics

Politics

Cinebar is recognized as being majority Republican and conservative, similar in voting demographics in respects to other rural areas within Lewis County. 

The results for the 2020 U.S. Presidential Election for the Cinebar voting district were as follows:

 Donald J. Trump (Republican) - 409 (74.64%)
 Joe Biden (Democrat) - 132 (24.09%)
 Jo Jorgensen (Libertarian) - 6 (1.09%)
 Howie Hawkins (Green) - 1 (0..18%)

References

Sources
 US Census Information

Populated places in Lewis County, Washington
Unincorporated communities in Lewis County, Washington
Unincorporated communities in Washington (state)